The 1979 Arizona Wildcats baseball team represented the University of Arizona in the 1979 NCAA Division I baseball season. The Wildcats played their home games at Wildcat Field. The team was coached by Jerry Kindall in his 7th year at Arizona.

The Wildcats won the Midwest Regional to advanced to the College World Series, where they were defeated by the Cal State Fullerton Titans.

Roster

Schedule 

! style="" | Regular Season
|- valign="top" 

|- align="center" bgcolor="#ffcccc"
| 1 || February 8 || Cal State Fullerton || Wildcat Field • Tucson, Arizona || 7–9 || 0–1 || –
|- align="center" bgcolor="#ffcccc"
| 2 || February 9 || Cal State Fullerton || Wildcat Field • Tucson, Arizona || 0–9 || 0–2 || –
|- align="center" bgcolor="#ffcccc"
| 3 || February 9 || Cal State Fullerton || Wildcat Field • Tucson, Arizona || 4–8 || 0–3 || –
|- align="center" bgcolor="#ccffcc"
| 4 || February 12 ||  || Wildcat Field • Tucson, Arizona || 11–10 || 1–3 || –
|- align="center" bgcolor="#ccffcc"
| 5 || February 13 || UC Santa Barbara || Wildcat Field • Tucson, Arizona || 13–10 || 2–3 || –
|- align="center" bgcolor="#ccffcc"
| 6 || February 14 || UC Santa Barbara || Wildcat Field • Tucson, Arizona || 15–7 || 3–3 || –
|- align="center" bgcolor="#ccffcc"
| 7 || February 16 ||  || Wildcat Field • Tucson, Arizona || 10–5 || 4–3 || –
|- align="center" bgcolor="#ccffcc"
| 8 || February 17 || New Mexico || Wildcat Field • Tucson, Arizona || 6–4 || 5–3 || –
|- align="center" bgcolor="#ccffcc"
| 9 || February 17 || New Mexico || Wildcat Field • Tucson, Arizona || 16–4 || 6–3 || –
|- align="center" bgcolor="#ccffcc"
| 10 || February 19 ||  || Wildcat Field • Tucson, Arizona || 7–6 || 7–3 || –
|- align="center" bgcolor="#ccffcc"
| 11 || February 20 || Lamar || Wildcat Field • Tucson, Arizona || 5–4 || 8–3 || –
|- align="center" bgcolor="#ccffcc"
| 12 || February 22 ||  || Wildcat Field • Tucson, Arizona || 12–2 || 9–3 || –
|- align="center" bgcolor="#ccffcc"
| 13 || February 23 || La Verne || Wildcat Field • Tucson, Arizona || 9–2 || 10–3 || –
|- align="center" bgcolor="#ffcccc"
| 14 || February 24 || La Verne || Wildcat Field • Tucson, Arizona || 4–11 || 10–4 || –
|- align="center" bgcolor="#ffcccc"
| 15 || February 26 ||  || Wildcat Field • Tucson, Arizona || 3–5 || 10–5 || –
|- align="center" bgcolor="#ccffcc"
| 16 || February 27 || Loyola Marymount || Wildcat Field • Tucson, Arizona || 11–10 || 11–5 || –
|-

|- align="center" bgcolor="#ccffcc"
| 17 || March 1 ||  || Wildcat Field • Tucson, Arizona || 6–5 || 12–5 || 1–0
|- align="center" bgcolor="#ffcccc"
| 18 || March 3 || Stanford || Wildcat Field • Tucson, Arizona || 7–9 || 12–6 || 1–1
|- align="center" bgcolor="#ccffcc"
| 19 || March 4 || Stanford || Wildcat Field • Tucson, Arizona || 15–6 || 13–6 || 2–1
|- align="center" bgcolor="#ccffcc"
| 20 || March 5 ||  || Wildcat Field • Tucson, Arizona || 12–9 || 14–6 || 2–1
|- align="center" bgcolor="#ffcccc"
| 21 || March 8 ||  || Wildcat Field • Tucson, Arizona || 4–12 || 14–7 || 2–2
|- align="center" bgcolor="#ccffcc"
| 22 || March 9 || UCLA || Wildcat Field • Tucson, Arizona || 13–4 || 15–7 || 3–2
|- align="center" bgcolor="#ffcccc"
| 23 || March 10 || UCLA || Wildcat Field • Tucson, Arizona  || 10–15 || 15–8 || 3–3
|- align="center" bgcolor="#ccffcc"
| 24 || March 13 ||  || Wildcat Field • Tucson, Arizona  || 10–6 || 16–8 || 3–3
|- align="center" bgcolor="#ffcccc"
| 25 || March 16 || at  || Dedeaux Field • Los Angeles, California  || 4–5 || 16–9 || 3–4
|- align="center" bgcolor="#ffcccc"
| 26 || March 17 || at Southern California || Dedeaux Field • Los Angeles, California || 8–9 || 16–10 || 3–5
|- align="center" bgcolor="#ffcccc"
| 27 || March 20 || at  || Olsen Field • College Station, Texas || 0–2 || 16–11 || 3–5
|- align="center" bgcolor="#ccffcc"
| 28 || March 20 || at Texas A&M || Olsen Field • College Station, Texas || 9–3 || 17–11 || 3–5
|- align="center" bgcolor="#ffcccc"
| 29 || March 22 || vs   || Disch–Falk Field • Austin, Texas || 3–5 || 17–12 || 3–5
|- align="center" bgcolor="#ccffcc"
| 30 || March 23 || at Texas || Disch–Falk Field • Austin, Texas || 8–2 || 18–12 || 3–5
|- align="center" bgcolor="#ccffcc"
| 31 || March 23 || at Texas || Disch–Falk Field • Austin, Texas || 7–4 || 19–12 || 3–5
|- align="center" bgcolor="#ccffcc"
| 32 || March 24 || at Texas || Disch–Falk Field • Austin, Texas || 7–3 || 20–12 || 3–5
|- align="center" bgcolor="#ffcccc"
| 33 || March 24 || at Texas || Disch–Falk Field • Austin, Texas || 0–4 || 20–13 || 3–5
|- align="center" bgcolor="#ccffcc"
| 34 || March 27 ||  || Wildcat Field • Tucson, Arizona || 11–1 || 21–13 || 3–5
|- align="center" bgcolor="#ffcccc"
| 35 || March 30 || at  || Evans Diamond • Berkeley, California || 0–2 || 21–14 || 3–6
|- align="center" bgcolor="#ccffcc"
| 36 || March 31 || at California || Evans Diamond • Berkeley, California || 6–3 || 22–14 || 4–6
|- align="center" bgcolor="#ffcccc"
| 37 || March 31 || at California || Evans Diamond • Berkeley, California || 4–8 || 22–15 || 4–7
|-

|- align="center" bgcolor="#ccffcc"
| 38 || April 5 ||  || Wildcat Field • Tucson, Arizona || 10–4 || 23–15 || 5–7
|- align="center" bgcolor="#ccffcc"
| 39 || April 6 || Arizona State || Wildcat Field • Tucson, Arizona || 12–9 || 24–15 || 6–7
|- align="center" bgcolor="#ccffcc"
| 40 || April 7 || Arizona State || Wildcat Field • Tucson, Arizona || 8–5 || 25–15 || 7–7
|- align="center" bgcolor="#ccffcc"
| 41 || April 9 ||  || Wildcat Field • Tucson, Arizona || 12–5 || 26–15 || 7–7
|- align="center" bgcolor="#ffcccc"
| 42 || April 12 || Southern California || Wildcat Field • Tucson, Arizona || 5–7 || 26–16 || 7–8
|- align="center" bgcolor="#ccffcc"
| 43 || April 12 || Southern California || Wildcat Field • Tucson, Arizona || 6–2 || 27–16 || 8–8
|- align="center" bgcolor="#ccffcc"
| 44 || April 13 || USC || Wildcat Field • Tucson, Arizona || 16–15 || 28–16 || 9–8
|- align="center" bgcolor="#ccffcc"
| 45 || April 14 || USC || Wildcat Field • Tucson, Arizona || 6–5 || 29–16 || 10–8
|- align="center" bgcolor="#ffcccc"
| 46 || April 20 || at Stanford || Sunken Diamond • Stanford, California || 7–13 || 29–17 || 10–9
|- align="center" bgcolor="#ffcccc"
| 47 || April 21 || at Stanford || Sunken Diamond • Stanford, California || 4–13 || 29–18 || 10–10
|- align="center" bgcolor="#ccffcc"
| 48 || April 22 || at Stanford || Sunken Diamond • Stanford, California || 8–6 || 30–18 || 11–10
|- align="center" bgcolor="#ffcccc"
| 49 || April 24 ||  || Wildcat Field • Tucson, Arizona || 5–6 || 30–19 || 11–10
|- align="center" bgcolor="#ccffcc"
| 50 || April 24 || Northern Arizona || Wildcat Field • Tucson, Arizona || 11–4 || 31–19 || 11–10
|- align="center" bgcolor="#ffcccc"
| 51 || April 27 || at UCLA || Sawtelle Field • Los Angeles, California || 1–13 || 31–20 || 11–11
|- align="center" bgcolor="#ffcccc"
| 52 || April 28 || at UCLA || Sawtelle Field • Los Angeles, California || 6–12 || 31–21 || 11–12
|- align="center" bgcolor="#ccffcc"
| 53 || April 28 || at UCLA || Sawtelle Field • Los Angeles, California || 6–5 || 32–21 || 12–12
|-

|- align="center" bgcolor="#ffcccc"
| 54 || May 3 || California || Wildcat Field • Tucson, Arizona || 9–15 || 32–22 || 12–13
|- align="center" bgcolor="#ccffcc"
| 55 || May 4 || California || Wildcat Field • Tucson, Arizona || 6–5 || 33–22 || 13–13
|- align="center" bgcolor="#ccffcc"
| 56 || May 5 || California || Wildcat Field • Tucson, Arizona || 19–18 || 34–22 || 14–13
|- align="center" bgcolor="#ccffcc"
| 57 || May 10 || at Arizona State || Packard Stadium • Tempe, Arizona || 12–1 || 35–22 || 15–13
|- align="center" bgcolor="#ccffcc"
| 58 || May 11 || at Arizona State || Packard Stadium • Tempe, Arizona || 9–6 || 36–22 || 16–13
|- align="center" bgcolor="#ccffcc"
| 59 || May 12 || at Arizona State || Packard Stadium • Tempe, Arizona || 6–4 || 37–22 || 17–13
|-

|-
|-
! style="" | Postseason
|- valign="top"

|- align="center" bgcolor="#ccffcc"
| 60 || May 16 || at  || Bailey Field • Pullman, Washington || 9–7 || 38–22 || 17–13
|- align="center" bgcolor="#ffcccc"
| 61 || May 17 || at Washington State || Bailey Field • Pullman, Washington || 8–9 || 38–23 || 17–13
|- align="center" bgcolor="#ccffcc"
| 62 || May 17 || at Washington State || Bailey Field • Pullman, Washington || 22–14 || 39–23 || 17–13
|-

|- align="center" bgcolor="#ccffcc"
| 63 || May 25 ||  || Wildcats Field • Tucson, Arizona || 8–1 || 40–23 || 17–13
|- align="center" bgcolor="#ccffcc"
| 64 || May 26 ||  || Wildcat Field • Tucson, Arizona || 10–2 || 41–23 || 17–13
|- align="center" bgcolor="#ccffcc"
| 65 || May 27 || Hawaii || Wildcat Field • Tucson, Arizona || 5–3 || 42–23 || 17–13
|-

|- align="center" bgcolor="#ccffcc"
| 66 || June 1 || vs Miami (FL) || Johnny Rosenblatt Stadium • Omaha, Nebraska || 5–1 || 43–23 || 17–13
|- align="center" bgcolor="#ffcccc"
| 67 || June 3 || vs Arkansas || Johnny Rosenblatt Stadium • Omaha, Nebraska || 3–10 || 43–24 || 17–13
|- align="center" bgcolor="#ffcccc"
| 68 || June 4 || vs Cal State Fullertone || Johnny Rosenblatt Stadium • Omaha, Nebraska || 3–16 || 43–25 || 17–13
|-

Awards and honors 
Clark Crist
 All-Pac-10 South Division

Terry Francona
 All-Pac-10 South Division

Craig Lefferts
 All-Pac-10 South Division

Brad Mills
 All-Pac-10 South Division

References 

Arizona Wildcats baseball seasons
Arizona Wildcats baseball
College World Series seasons
Arizona